D2: The Mighty Ducks (also known as The Mighty Ducks 2) is a 1994 American sports comedy-drama film directed by Sam Weisman. It is the second installment in The Mighty Ducks trilogy, and a sequel to the 1992 film The Mighty Ducks produced by Walt Disney Pictures, The Kerner Entertainment Company and Avnet–Kerner Productions. It was succeeded by the final film of the series, D3: The Mighty Ducks, in 1996.

Plot
Former Pee-Wee hockey coach Gordon Bombay is a star in the minor leagues, expected to reach the National Hockey League. However, a career-ending knee injury brings him back to the Blukeville district of Minneapolis. Bombay is offered a chance to coach a team representing the United States in the Junior Goodwill Games in Los Angeles. He manages to reunite most of his former Ducks players, while the Hawks try to enact revenge for their humiliating loss two years earlier. Their plans are foiled by Fulton, who leaves them tied up in their underpants. Team USA consists of many of the old Ducks, in addition to five new players with special talents.

In Los Angeles, the lure of celebrity distracts Bombay, who begins to neglect the team for a luxurious lifestyle. The team wins easy victories over Trinidad and Tobago and Italy in the double-elimination tournament. Fulton Reed and Dean Portman gain recognition for their enforcer skills, and are dubbed the "Bash Brothers". Backup goaltender Julie Gaffney asks Bombay for a chance to play, but is told to wait as goalie Greg Goldberg is on a hot streak.

The team suffers an embarrassing 12–1 defeat against Iceland, coached by ex-NHL player Wolf "The Dentist" Stansson. USA plays badly, and star center Adam Banks is slashed in the wrist. Frustrated, Bombay drives his players even harder, but they begin to suffer from complete exhaustion. Realizing the children are too tired to complete their school work or even stay awake in class, the team's tutor Michelle McKay intervenes, cancelling practice and confronting Bombay over his thoughtlessness. Once better rested, the players encounter a street hockey team who teaches them to play like "the real Team USA".

Bombay continues to suffer from the pressure until Jan, brother of Bombay's mentor Hans, visits and reminds him of his love for the game. In their match against Germany, Bombay fails to arrive on time, forcing Charlie to tell the referee Michelle is the team's assistant coach. The team struggles, entering the third period tied, until Bombay arrives and apologizes to the team for his behavior. Inspired by the true return of their coach, the players win the game with their signature "Flying V", and advance to the next round.

The renewed Bombay finally realizes Adam's wrist injury and benches him despite his complaints. To fill the open roster spot, Charlie recruits street hockey player Russ Tyler, whose unique "knucklepuck" – which rotates end over end rather than spinning around its centerline – secures USA's victory over Russia, advancing them to the championship game for a rematch against Iceland. Adam's injury is healed only to find Team USA with a full roster. Knowing the team needs Russ's knucklepuck and Adam's skill against Iceland, Charlie gives up his own spot, cementing his leadership as true team captain.

In the final game, the physically imposing Iceland initially dominates as the Ducks incur penalties: Ken picks a fight with an opposing player, the Bash Brothers fight the entire Iceland bench and Dwayne lassos an opposing player before he can check Connie. An annoyed Bombay observes, "this isn't a hockey game, it's a circus."

After a rousing locker room speech from Bombay and new Duck jerseys from Jan, the team emerges rejuvenated. The Ducks tie the game with goals from Connie, Banks, Luis, and finally Russ, who was targeted by Iceland but disguised himself as Goldberg to pull off a successful "knucklepuck". The game is forced to go to a five-shot shootout. With a 4–3 score in favor of the Ducks, Gunnar Stahl, the tournament's leading scorer, is Team Iceland's final shooter. Bombay replaces Goldberg with Julie, who has a faster glove. Gunnar fires a hard slapshot, and Julie falls to the ice. The entire stadium waits in breathless anticipation as she opens her glove and drops the puck, revealing the game-winning save and the Ducks’ triumph over Iceland to win the tournament.

The team returns to Minnesota, and sing Queen's "We Are the Champions" around a campfire.

Cast
 Emilio Estevez as Coach Gordon Bombay
 Kathryn Erbe as Michelle McKay
 Michael Tucker as Don Tibbles
 Jan Rubeš as Jan
 Carsten Norgaard as Coach Wolf "The Dentist" Stansson
 Maria Ellingsen as Maria
 Joshua Jackson as Charlie Conway, #96
 Elden Henson as Fulton Reed, #44
 Shaun Weiss as Greg Goldberg, #33
 Brandon Adams as Jesse Hall, #9
 Matt Doherty as Lester Averman, #4
 Vincent Larusso as Adam Banks, #99
 Garette Ratliff Henson as Guy Germaine, #00
 Marguerite Moreau as Connie Moreau, #18
 Colombe Jacobsen as Julie "The Cat" Gaffney, #6
 Aaron Lohr as Dean Portman, #21
 Ty O'Neal as Dwayne Robertson, #7
 Kenan Thompson as Russ Tyler, #56
 Mike Vitar as Luis Mendoza, #22
 Justin Wong as Ken Wu, #16
 Scott Whyte as Gunnar Stahl, #9 of Team Iceland
 Vicellous Reon Shannon as James Tyler, Russ' Older Brother

Cameo appearances
There are several cameo appearances in D2: The Mighty Ducks from famous athletes.

 Kristi Yamaguchi as Champion Olympic Figure Skater
 Greg Louganis as Champion Olympic Diver
 Kareem Abdul-Jabbar as Basketball Player
 Wayne Gretzky, Chris Chelios, Luc Robitaille, Cam Neely as National Hockey League (NHL) Players
 Bob Miller as Play-By-Play Announcer For The Championship Game vs. Iceland
 Darren Pang as Color Commentator For The Championship Game vs. Iceland
 Mike Emrick as Play-By-Play Commentator

Departures
Mighty Duck players that were in the first film but not this one:
 Tammy Duncan (Jane Plank; her figure skating skills were replaced with those of Ken Wu)
 Tommy Duncan (Danny Tamberelli)
 Terry Hall (Jussie Smollett, despite the continuation of the character's brother, Jesse)
 Dave Karp (Aaron Schwartz)
 Peter Mark (J.D. Daniels; his street punk goon image was replaced with those of Dean Portman)
 Phillip Banks (Hal Fort Atkinson III)
 Hans (Joss Ackland; Bombay's mentor was replaced by his brother, Jan, though Ackland reprises his role in the third film)

Production
The Mighty Ducks spawned a sequel and Iceland was chosen instead of Russia as enemies.

The filming of the final game was the very first event to take place at the then brand new Arrowhead Pond, which attracted approximately 15,000 people. As the filming would span over several days, the production team was aware that the crowd would not be as consistent. To accommodate the dwindling crowd, cardboard stand-ups were brought in and moved around to fill-in shots.

Reaction

Critical reception
Like its predecessor, the film received negative reviews. It has a 21% rating on Rotten Tomatoes with an average rating of 3.9/10. Desson Howe of The Washington Post wrote: "D2: The Mighty Ducks reaches an extraordinary low – even for a Disney sequel. This unctuous barrage of flag-waving, message-mongering, counterfeit morality, which contains the stalest kiddie-team heroics in recent memory, makes the original, innocuous 'Ducks' look like one of the Great Works."

Audiences polled by CinemaScore an average grade of "A" on an A+ to F scale.

Year-end worst-of lists 
9th – Glenn Lovell, San Jose Mercury News

Box office
In its opening weekend, the film grossed $10,356,748 domestically. It was a financial success, with a final domestic box office total of $45,610,410.

Home media
The film was released on VHS on August 17, 1994, on DVD on September 3, 2002 and was also released on Blu-ray Disc on May 23, 2017.

Soundtrack
 Queen – "We Will Rock You"
 Poorboys – "You Ain't Seen Nothin' Yet" (Bachman-Turner Overdrive Cover)
 Gary Glitter – "Rock and Roll"
 Martha Wash – "Mr. Big Stuff"
 David Newman – "Mighty Ducks Suite"
 Tag Team – "Whoomp! (There It Is)"
 The Troggs – "Wild Thing"
 Gear Daddies – "Zamboni"
 Queen – "We Are the Champions"
 John Bisaha – "Rock the Pond"

Notes

References

External links

 
 
 
 
 

The Mighty Ducks
1994 films
1990s sports comedy-drama films
American children's comedy films
American sequel films
Films shot in Minnesota
American sports comedy-drama films
1990s English-language films
Films directed by Sam Weisman
Films set in Minnesota
American ice hockey films
Walt Disney Pictures films
Films with screenplays by Steven Brill
Films scored by J. A. C. Redford
Films set in California
1994 directorial debut films
Films shot in California
1990s American films